is a railway station in the town of Higashiizu, Shizuoka Prefecture, Japan, operated by the privately owned Izu Kyūkō Line .

Lines

Station layout
Izu-Ōkawa Station has two opposing side platforms serving two tracks connected by a level crossing. Track 2 is used for trains in both directions, and is the track in normal use. Track 1 is used at times to permit the passage of an express train, as the station does not have a headshunt. The station is unattended.

Platforms

Adjacent stations

History 
Izu-Ōkawa Station was opened on December 10, 1961. The station is located next to Ōkawa hot springs, and there is a foot bath on the grounds of the station.

Passenger statistics
In fiscal 2017, the station was used by an average of 136 passengers daily (boarding passengers only).

Surrounding area
 Ōkawa Onsen

See also
 List of Railway Stations in Japan

References

External links

Official home page.

Railway stations in Shizuoka Prefecture
Izu Kyūkō Line
Railway stations in Japan opened in 1961
Stations of Izu Kyūkō
Higashiizu, Shizuoka